Pabo may refer to:

Personal name
Pabo Post Prydain (fl. c. 500?), northern British king
Pabo, supposed founder of Llanbabo, Anglesey
Pabo, abbot of St. Emmeram's Abbey

Geographic name
Pabbo, a town in northern Uganda
Pabo, Uttarakhand, a community development block of Uttarakhand state of India
Pabo, a crater on Mars

Music
Pabo, a Japanese female idol group created for the variety show Quiz! Hexagon II

See also
 Pabos (disambiguation)